County Road 862 is a Norwegian county road in Troms og Finnmark county, Norway. Part of the route is one of eighteen designated National Tourist Routes in Norway. The Tromsø Bridge and Sandnessund Bridge are both located on the route.

References

862
862
National Tourist Routes in Norway
Senja
Tromsø